Bigby may refer to:

Places
 Bigby, Lincolnshire, one of the Thankful Villages in Lincolnshire, England

People
 Atari Bigby, American football player
 Larry Bigbie, American baseball player

Fictional characters
 Ned Bigby, title character of Nickelodeon's sitcom, Ned's Declassified School Survival Guide
 Bigby, a character in the  Dungeons & Dragons role-playing game's setting of Greyhawk
 Bigby Wolf, from the comic book series Fables

Businesses
 Biggby Coffee, a coffee franchise business